The Waipu Fishing Port is a fishing port in Houlong Township, Miaoli County, Taiwan.

Events
 2012 Miaoli Marine Tour Festival

Transportation
The port is accessible west from Dashan Station of Taiwan Railways.

See also
 Fisheries Agency

References

Ports and harbors of Miaoli County